Grover Alexander "Moose" Froese (February 14, 1916 – July 20, 1982) was an American professional baseball umpire who worked in the American League during 1952 and 1953. He later worked as a baseball scout.

Career
He also umpired in the Eastern League, International League, and the American Association. After his umpiring career, Froese served as a scout for the Philadelphia Phillies.

Personal life
Froese served in the U.S. Army from 1942 to 1946.

Death
Froese died in Bay Shore, New York in 1982.

References

1916 births
1982 deaths
Major League Baseball umpires
Philadelphia Phillies scouts
Sportspeople from New York (state)
Burials at Calverton National Cemetery
People from Staten Island
People from Bay Shore, New York